Dawit Yohannes (10 October 1956 – 28 January 2019) was the first Speaker of the House of Peoples' Representatives, the lower chamber of the Ethiopian Parliament, from 1995 to 2005. He was also the Permanent Representative to the United Nations.

Personal life 
Dawit Yohannes was born in Addis Ababa on 10 October 1956. Dawit attended Addis Ababa University, Georgetown University and Southeastern University. In 2000, Dawit received a Master of Laws from the University of Amsterdam. Dawit was married and has three children. He died on 28 January 2019, aged 62.

References 

1956 births
2019 deaths
20th-century Ethiopian politicians
21st-century Ethiopian politicians
Speakers of the House of Peoples' Representatives (Ethiopia)
Addis Ababa University alumni
Georgetown University alumni
University of Amsterdam alumni
People from Addis Ababa